Mohammadabad (also Romanized as Moḩammadābād) is a village in Rigan Rural District, in the Central District of Rigan County, Kerman Province, Iran. At the 2006 census, its population was 38, in 8 families.

References 

Populated places in Rigan County